Steven Zhang may refer to:
Zhang Kangyang (born 1991), Chinese businessman and chairman of Italian football club Inter Milan
Zhang Xincheng (born 1995), Chinese actor